Gang Busters is an American dramatic radio program heralded as "the only national program that brings you authentic police case histories." It premiered on January 15, 1936, and was broadcast over 21 years through November 27, 1957.

History 
So-called "true crime" magazines were highly popular in the 1930s and the movie G Men starring James Cagney, released in the spring of 1935, had proven to be a big hit.  Producer-director Phillips H. Lord thought there was a place on radio for a show of the same type. To emphasize the authenticity of his dramatizations, Lord produced the initial radio show, G-Men, in close association with FBI Director J. Edgar Hoover. Hoover was not particularly favorable to the notion of such a program, but U. S. Attorney General Homer Stille Cummings gave it his full support.

G-Men dramatized FBI cases, but Hoover insisted that only closed cases would be used.  Hoover also demanded that he or a top-level aide review and approve every script.  Hoover preferred that scripts downplay gunfights and car chases, and spend more time on systematic investigation and legwork.  Agents should be shown as intelligent, hard-working and essentially faceless cogs in his technically savvy crime-fighting organization.  Those restrictions hampered Lord, who saw his creation as a public service, but one that had to entertain as well as inform.

The first program dramatized the story of the notorious gangster John Dillinger, who was tracked down by FBI agents and shot to death outside the Biograph Theater on July 24, 1934. The second covered Lester Joseph Gillis, aka Baby Face Nelson. Although the shows were a hit with the general public, there were naysayers, some of whom deplored this sensational new style of radio show. Hyper-sensitive to any criticism, Hoover almost squelched the project and made life more and more difficult for Lord.

G-Men, using only FBI cases, was subject to Hoover's whims and restrictions.  Gang Busters, however, featured interesting and dramatic crimes from the files of law enforcement organizations all over the country. G-Men was on NBC Radio from July 20 to October 12, 1935, sponsored by Chevrolet.

The "sequel," Gang Busters, debuted in mid-January, 1936.  If anything, the opening sound effects became even more elaborate and aggressive. The show opened with a barrage of blaring sound effects – a shrill police whistle, convicts marching in formation, police siren wailing, machine guns firing, and tires squealing. Then, an authoritative voice would announce the title of that night's program: "Tonight, Gang Busters presents the Case of the —." Finally, the opening would end with more blasts from a police whistle. This intrusive introduction led to the popular catchphrase "came on like Gangbusters."

To lend an extra air of authenticity to the presentation, Lord had Norman Schwarzkopf Sr., former head of the New Jersey State Police give a short talk to lead into the actual dramatization. (Schwarzkopf was the father of General Norman Schwarzkopf Jr., leader of the coalition forces in the 1990–1991 Persian Gulf War.) That authentic voice became even more important after Lord ended his connection with the FBI. After about 1945, Lewis Joseph Valentine, crime-busting New York City Police Commissioner replaced Schwarzkopf as the authoritative opening speaker.

Gang Busters aired on CBS from January 15, 1936 to June 15, 1940, sponsored by Colgate-Palmolive and Cue magazine. From October 11, 1940 to December 25, 1948, it was heard on the Blue Network, with various sponsors that included Sloan's Liniment, Waterman pens and Tide. Returning to CBS on January 8, 1949, it ran until June 25, 1955, sponsored by Grape-Nuts and Wrigley's chewing gum. The final series was on the Mutual Broadcasting System from October 5, 1955 to November 27, 1957.

Gang Busters often featured prominent names in radio broadcasting, many of whom also starred in films and television. Two of the most famous were Richard Widmark and Art Carney. Widmark was typecast as a villain for many years, but finally managed to break that mold. Carney became especially famous for his role with Jackie Gleason on The Honeymooners, but he had a much broader career than that. Joan Banks, who later played many TV roles, was a regular cast member. Her husband, Frank Lovejoy, also appeared often, and later went on to star in many films and an ABC crime drama. Larry Haines was another regular on the show. He went on to an extensive career in TV soap operas. A lesser known actor on the show was Leon Janney, who apparently played both juvenile roles and ones requiring an unusual accent.

Comics

The popularity of the radio show prompted a spin-off comic book published by DC Comics, which ran for 67 issues between 1947 and 1958. Big Little Books based on the series were also produced.

Film and television versions

Universal Pictures made a very popular Gang Busters serial film in 1942, starring Kent Taylor, Irene Hervey, Ralph Morgan, and Robert Armstrong.

NBC aired a 30-minute television series version from March 20, 1952 to Oct. 23, 1952, hosted by Chester Morris. The series did well in the Nielsen ratings, finishing at #14 in the 1951–1952 season and at #8 in 1952–1953. It went off the air because it alternated weekly with Dragnet, and when that series could produce enough episodes weekly, NBC had no more use for Gang Busters as a stop-gap show.

Episodes of the show were later reedited into two feature films, Gang Busters (1955, with Myron Healey as Public Enemy No. 4) and Guns Don't Argue (1957, with Healey as John Dillinger).

In 1953, NBC Film Division syndicated the episodes, with the title changed to Captured. An ad for the program indicated that nine episodes of the syndicated version were new; those episodes had a copyright date of 1955. Vivi Janiss was cast in three television episodes: "The Blonde Tigress" (1952), "The Rocco Case" (1952), and The Rocco Trapani Case" (1955).

References

External links
"Gang Busters" Frank Lovejoy
"Gang Busters" in the Old Time Radio Archive (19 episodes)
Radio Lovers: Gang Busters (20 episodes)
Gang Busters Step In
 

 Crime Busters at CVTA with episode list
True Crime Radio and Listener Disenchantment with Network Broadcasting, 1935–1946

American radio dramas
1936 radio programme debuts
1957 radio programme endings
1930s American radio programs
1940s American radio programs
1950s American crime television series
1950s American radio programs
1952 American television series debuts
1955 American television series endings
American legal television series
Black-and-white American television shows
CBS Radio programs
Defunct American comics
First-run syndicated television programs in the United States
Mutual Broadcasting System programs
NBC Blue Network radio programs
NBC original programming
Radio programs adapted into comics
Radio programs adapted into films
Radio programs adapted into television shows
Television series based on radio series
United States National Recording Registry recordings